Copelatus pandanorum is a species of diving beetle. It is part of the genus Copelatus in the subfamily Copelatinae of the family Dytiscidae. It was described by Hugh Scott in 1912.

Scott collected specimens from the Seychelles islands of Praslin, Silhouette, and Mahé.

References

pandanorum
Beetles described in 1912